Municipalities in Bolivia are administrative divisions of the entire national territory governed by local elections. Municipalities are the third level of administrative divisions, below departments and provinces. Some of the provinces consist of only one municipality. In these cases the municipalities are identical to the provinces they belong to. There are 340 municipalities.

History of governance
Municipalities in Bolivia are each led by a mayor, an executive office. Mayors were appointed by the national government from 1878 to 1942 and from 1949 to 1987. Local elections were held under the 1942 municipal code, which was in force until 1991. The 1985 Organic Law of Municipalities restored local elections for mayor and created a legislative body, the municipal council.

In 1994, the entire territory of Bolivia was merged into municipalities, where previously only urban areas were organized as municipalities. As an effect of decentralization through the 1994 Law of Popular Participation the number of municipalities in Bolivia has risen from an initial twenty-four (in 1994) to 327 (in 2005), to 337 (at the time of the 2010 elections), to 339. Of the 327 municipalities existing after 2005, 187 are inhabited by a mainly indigenous population; 184 of these are located in the five Andean departments, with the remaining three in Santa Cruz department. New municipalities must have at least 10,000 residents, or 5,000 in the case of border areas.

List of municipalities

The municipalities are as follows ordered by department:

Beni
Baures Municipality
Exaltación Municipality
Guayaramerín Municipality
Huacaraje Municipality
Loreto Municipality, Beni
Magdalena Municipality, Beni
Puerto Siles Municipality
Reyes Municipality
Riberalta Municipality
Rurrenabaque Municipality
San Andrés Municipality, Beni
San Borja Municipality
San Ignacio Municipality, Beni
San Javier Municipality, Beni
San Joaquín Municipality, Beni
San Ramón Municipality, Beni
Santa Ana Municipality, Beni
Santa Rosa Municipality, Beni
Trinidad Municipality, Beni

Cochabamba
Aiquile Municipality
Alalay Municipality
Anzaldo Municipality
Arani Municipality
Arbieto Municipality
Arque Municipality
Ayopaya Municipality
Bolívar Municipality, Cochabamba
Capinota Municipality
Chimoré Municipality
Cliza Municipality
Cocapata Municipality
Cochabamba Municipality
Colcapirhua Municipality
Colomi Municipality
Cuchumuela Municipality
Entre Ríos Municipality, Cochabamba
Mizque Municipality
Morochata Municipality
Muela Municipality
Omereque Municipality
Pasorapa Municipality
Pocona Municipality
Pojo Municipality
Puerto Villarroel Municipality
Punata Municipality
Quillacollo Municipality
Sacaba Municipality
Sacabamba Municipality
San Benito Municipality
Santivañez Municipality
Shinahota Municipality / Shinaota Municipality / Sinahota Municipality
Sicaya Municipality
Sipe Sipe Municipality
Tacachi Municipality
Tacopaya Municipality
Tapacarí Municipality
Tarata Municipality
Tiquipaya Municipality
Tiraque Municipality
Toco Municipality
Tolata Municipality
Totora Municipality
Tunari Municipality
Vacas Municipality
Vila Vila Municipality
Vinto Municipality

Chuquisaca 
Azurduy Municipality
Camargo Municipality, Chuquisaca
Culpina Municipality
El Villar Municipality
Huacareta Municipality
Huacaya Municipality
Icla Municipality
Incahuasi Municipality
Mojocoya Municipality
Camataqui Municipality
Las Carreras Municipality
Macharetí Municipality
Monteagudo Municipality
Padilla Municipality
Poroma Municipality
Presto Municipality
San Lucas Municipality
Sopachuy Municipality
Sucre Municipality, Bolivia
Tarabuco Municipality
Tomina Municipality
Villa Alcalá Municipality
Villa Charcas Municipality
Villa Serrano Municipality
Villa Vaca Guzmán Municipality
Villa Zudañez Municipality
Tarvita Municipality
Yotala Municipality
Yamparáez Municipality

La Paz
Achacachi Municipality
Achocalla Municipality
Alto Beni Municipality
Ancoraimes Municipality
Apolo Municipality
Aucapata Municipality
Ayata Municipality
Ayo Ayo Municipality
Batallas Municipality
Cairoma Municipality
Cajuata Municipality
Calacoto Municipality
Calamarca Municipality
Caquiaviri Municipality
Caranavi Municipality
Catacora Municipality
Chacarilla Municipality
Charaña Municipality
Chúa Cocani Municipality
Chulumani Municipality
Chuma Municipality
Collana Municipality
Colquencha Municipality
Colquiri Municipality
Comanche Municipality
Combaya Municipality
Copacabana Municipality, La Paz
Coripata Municipality
Coro Coro Municipality
Coroico Municipality
Curva Municipality
Desaguadero Municipality
El Alto Municipality, La Paz
Escoma Municipality
General Juan José Pérez Municipality
Guanay Municipality
Guaqui Municipality
Huatajata Municipality
Huarina Municipality
Humanata Municipality
Ichoca Municipality
Inquisivi Municipality
Irupana Municipality
Ixiamas Municipality
La Asunta Municipality
La Paz Municipality
Laja Municipality
Licoma Pampa Municipality
Luribay Municipality
Malla Municipality
Mecapaca Municipality
Mocomoco Municipality
Nazacara de Pacajes Municipality
Palca Municipality
Palos Blancos Municipality
Papel Pampa Municipality
Patacamaya Municipality
Pelechuco Municipality
Pucarani Municipality
Puerto Acosta Municipality
Puerto Carabuco Municipality
Puerto Pérez Municipality
Quiabaya Municipality
Quime Municipality
San Buenaventura Municipality, La Paz
San Pedro de Curahuara Municipality
San Pedro de Tiquina Municipality
Santiago de Callapa Municipality
Santiago de Huata Municipality
Santiago de Machaca Municipality
Sapahaqui Municipality
Sica Sica Municipality
Sorata Municipality
Tacacoma Municipality
Tiwanaku Municipality
Tipuani Municipality
Tito Yupanqui Municipality
Umala Municipality
Viacha Municipality
Waldo Ballivián Municipality
Yaco Municipality
Yanacachi Municipality

Oruro
Andamarca Municipality
Antequera Municipality
Belén de Andamarca Municipality
Caracollo Municipality
Carangas Municipality
Challapata Municipality
Chipaya Municipality
Choquecota Municipality
Coipasa Municipality
Corque Municipality
Cruz de Machacamarca Municipality
Curahuara de Carangas Municipality
El Choro Municipality
Escara Municipality
Esmeralda Municipality
Eucaliptus Municipality
Huachacalla Municipality
Huanuni Municipality
Huayllamarca Municipality
La Rivera Municipality
Machacamarca Municipality
Oruro Municipality
Pampa Aullagas Municipality
Pazña Municipality
Sabaya Municipality
Salinas de Garci Mendoza Municipality
Santiago de Huari Municipality
Santuario de Quillacas Municipality
Todos Santos Municipality
Toledo Municipality
Totora Municipality, Oruro
Turco Municipality
Poopó Municipality
Yunguyo del Litoral Municipality

Pando
Bella Flor Municipality
Bolpebra Municipality
Cobija Municipality
Filadelfia Municipality
Ingavi Municipality
Nueva Esperanza Municipality
Porvenir Municipality
Puerto Gonzalo Moreno Municipality
Puerto Rico Municipality
San Lorenzo Municipality, Pando
San Pedro Municipality, Pando
Santa Rosa del Abuná Municipality
Santos Mercado Municipality
Sena Municipality
Villa Nueva Municipality

Potosí
Acasio Municipality
Arampampa Municipality
Atocha Municipality
Betanzos Municipality
Caiza "D" Municipality
Chochas Municipality / Cochas Municipality
Caripuyo Municipality
Chaquí Municipality
Chayanta Municipality
Chuquihuta Municipality / Chuquihuta Ayllu Jucumani
Colcha "K" Municipality
Colquechaca Municipality
Cotagaita Municipality
Llallagua Municipality
Llica Municipality
Mojinete Municipality
Ocurí Municipality
Pocoata Municipality
Porco Municipality
Potosí Municipality
Puna Municipality
Ravelo Municipality
Sacaca Municipality
San Agustín Municipality
San Antonio de Esmoruco Municipality
San Pablo de Lípez Municipality
San Pedro de Buena Vista Municipality
San Pedro de Quemes Municipality
Tacobamba Municipality
Tahua Municipality
Tinguipaya Municipality
Tomave Municipality
Toro Toro Municipality
Tupiza Municipality
Uncía Municipality
Urmiri Municipality
Uyuni Municipality
Villazón Municipality
Vitichi Municipality
Yocalla Municipality

Santa Cruz
Ascensión de Guarayos Municipality
Ayacucho Municipality, Santa Cruz /  Porongo Municipality
Boyuibe Municipality
Buena Vista Municipality
Cabezas Municipality
Camiri Municipality
Charagua Municipality
Comarapa Municipality
Concepción Municipality
Cotoca Municipality
Cuevo Municipality
El Puente Municipality, Santa Cruz
El Torno Municipality
General Saavedra Municipality
Gutiérrez Municipality
La Guardia Municipality
Lagunillas Municipality, Santa Cruz
Mairana Municipality
Mineros Municipality
Montero Municipality
Moro Moro Municipality
Okinawa Municipality
Pailón Municipality
Pampa Grande Municipality
Portachuelo Municipality
Postrer Valle Municipality
Pucara Municipality
Puerto Quijarro Municipality
Puerto Suarez Municipality
Quirusillas Municipality
Roboré Municipality
Saipina Municipality
Samaipata Municipality
San Antonio del Lomerío Municipality
San Carlos Municipality, Santa Cruz
San Ignacio Municipality, Santa Cruz
San Javier Municipality, Santa Cruz
San José Municipality
San Julián Municipality
San Matías Municipality
San Miguel Municipality
San Rafael Municipality, Santa Cruz
San Ramón Municipality, Santa Cruz
Santa Cruz de la Sierra Municipality
Santa Rosa del Sara Municipality
Trigal Municipality
Urubichá Municipality
Vallegrande Municipality / Valle Grande Municipality
Warnes Municipality
Yapacaní Municipality

Tarija
Bermejo Municipality
Caraparí Municipality
El Puente Municipality, Tarija
Entre Ríos Municipality, Tarija
Padcaya Municipality
San Lorenzo Municipality, Tarija
Tarija Municipality
Uriondo Municipality
Villamontes Municipality
Yacuiba Municipality
Yunchará Municipality

References

 
Subdivisions of Bolivia
Bolivia 3
Municipalities, Bolivia
Bolivia geography-related lists